Rhapsody is the second solo studio album by American rapper Mr. Mike. It was released on September 7, 1999 through Priority Records. Production was handled by DJ Battlecat, Dah Dah, Mike B., Gerardo Hernandez, Fredwreck, and Mr. Mike himself. It features guest appearances from Napp-1, Mack 10, Ras Kass and Jennifer Brumfield. The album peaked at number 172 on the Billboard 200 and number 36 on the Top R&B/Hip-Hop Albums chart. Its lead single, "Texas 2000", reached #93 on the Hot R&B/Hip-Hop Songs and #13 on the Hot Rap Songs.

Track listing

Personnel
 Michael "Mr. Mike" Walls – main artist, producer (tracks: 2, 9, 11, 14, 15), mixing (tracks: 2, 5, 8-10, 12, 16), executive producer
 Napp-1 – featured artist (tracks: 4, 5, 14)
 Dedrick "Mack 10" Rolison – featured artist (track 7)
 John "Ras Kass" Austin – featured artist (track 15)
 Jennifer Brumfield – featured artist (track 16)
 Gerardo Hernandez – producer (track 1), co-producer (tracks: 2, 9), mixing (tracks: 2, 5, 8-10, 12, 16)
 Kevin "DJ Battlecat" Gilliam – producer (tracks: 3, 4, 7, 13), co-producer (tracks: 11, 14, 15), mixing (tracks: 3, 4, 7, 11, 13-15)
 Michael "Mike B." Banks – producer (tracks: 5, 12)
 Dante "Dah-Dah" Powell – producer (tracks: 8, 16)
 Farid "Fredwreck" Nassar – producer (track 10)
 Kris Solem – mastering
 Marvin Watkins – executive producer, A&R
 Art Shoji – art direction
 Manuel J. Donayre – art direction, digital artwork, design
 William Hames – photography
 Marlene C. Durio – A&R
 Joe Early – management
 Ron Early Jr. – management

Charts

References

External links

1999 albums
Mr. Mike albums
Priority Records albums
Albums produced by Fredwreck
Albums produced by Battlecat (producer)